Pennan is a small village in Aberdeenshire, Scotland, consisting of a small harbour and a single row of homes, including a hotel. It is on the north-facing coast and is about one hour's drive from Aberdeen. It was formerly known as St Magnus Haven or Auchmedden.

Etymology
The name Pennan was recorded in 1587 as Pennand. It is possibly derived from the Brittonic element *pen meaning "head, end, promontory" (Welsh pen).

Area history
 
Pennan seems to have come into existence as a fishing village in the 18th century. The people of Pennan were dependent on the sea. Most families had small boats for their own personal use. Where the men would catch the fish, it was usually down to the women and children to try to sell it to clients in the country. Until the 1930s, the population of the village seems to have come under three main surnames - Watt, Gatt and West. In the last 50 years, most of the native families have moved out and most of the houses have been bought as holiday homes.

Pennan became famous in the 1980s for being used as one of the main locations for the film Local Hero, and representing the fictional village of Ferness. Film enthusiasts have come from all over the world to make a phone call in the red telephone box in the village. The phone box featured in the film was a prop. The genuine telephone box, a few yards away, was hidden from view during filming by a prop shed. The Pennan phone box (+44 (0)1346 6210) has been a listed building since 1989. 

Landslips, especially one in 2007, have been damaging the village. In 2009 a 25-foot crack appeared on the cliff side, sparking calls for the village to be evacuated.

This part of Aberdeenshire was inhabited by prehistoric peoples since at least the Bronze Age. One of the most ancient extant monuments is the long barrow at Longman Hill.

The nearby harled early-19th-century farmhouse of Mains of Auchmedden "recall the palace of the Bairds of Auchmedden, demolished in the late 18th century". Some of its materials was possibly reused in New Pitsligo.

Stone lifting enthusiasts can now enjoy the opportunity to lift the Millshore Stone   which is a natural lifting stone, thought to be made of granite. It can be easily found next to Mill of Nethermill  which is the bay immediately west of Pennan.

Footnotes

References
 United Kingdom Ordnance Survey Map (2004) Landranger, 1:50000 scale
 C.Michael Hogan (2008) Longman Hill, Modern Antiquarian

External links

  Parish churches – website for Aberdour and Pennan churches
  The Pennan Inn - hotel in Pennan

Villages in Aberdeenshire